The athletics competition at the 1975 Pan American Games was held in Mexico City, Mexico between 13 and 20 October.

Medal summary

Men's events

Women's events

Medal table

Participating nations

Notes

References

GBR Athletics

 
Athletics
1975
Pan American Games
1975 Pan American Games